The European Soundmix Show 1996 was the first European Soundmix Show.
 
It was held in Amsterdam, the Netherlands, and Germany won the show with Bianca Shomburg imitating Celine Dion.

Results

European Soundmix Show
1996 in music
1996 in the Netherlands